Deltophora maculata is a moth of the family Gelechiidae. It is found in Georgia, Turkey, Armenia, Azerbaijan, Turkmenistan, Syria, Lebanon, Israel, Iran, Afghanistan and Greece, as well as on Crete and Cyprus. It has also been recorded from Saudi Arabia, but this is based on a misidentification.

The length of the forewings is 5–7 mm. The forewings are whitish grey to grey-brown, with dark brown markings. Adults have been recorded on wing from April to September and in November.

References

Moths described in 1879
Deltophora
Moths of Europe
Moths of Asia